PostEurop is the association of European public postal operators, one of the constituent unions of the Universal Postal Union. PostEurop was created in 1993 to simplify the exchange of mails in Europe, a task previously undertaken by the European Conference of Postal and Telecommunications Administrations (CEPT, from its French acronym). A smaller but similar organization is the Small European Postal Administration Cooperation.

PostEurop's headquarters are in Brussels, Belgium.

Since 1993 PostEurop has co-ordinated the annual issue of Europa postage stamps, previously a CEPT function.

Members

See also 
Small European Postal Administration Cooperation

References

External links

Postal organizations
Universal Postal Union
Organisations based in Brussels
International organisations based in Belgium
Organizations established in 1993
1993 establishments in Europe
1993 establishments in Belgium